Bicyclus abnormis, the western white-tipped bush brown, is a butterfly in the family Nymphalidae. It is found in north-eastern Guinea, Sierra Leone, Ivory Coast and Ghana. The habitat consists of forests.

References

Elymniini
Butterflies described in 1909